Robin Alexander (born 13 May 1975 in Essen, North Rhine-Westphalia) is a German journalist and author. He reports mainly for the Die Welt group on the German Chancellery and the CDU/CSU parties.

Life
Robin Alexander studied history and journalism at the Leipzig University. From 1998 to 1999 he completed an internship at the Tageszeitung in Berlin, where he worked as a reporter and editor from 2001 to 2006. He was a columnist for the English-language city magazine Exberliner, made reportage trips through southern Africa and was a guest editor at The Star in Johannesburg in 2004. After one year of parental leave, he became founding editor of the German Vanity Fair in 2006.

Since 2008, Alexander has been writing for Die Welt und Welt am Sonntag, reporting on the German Chancellery since 2010 and accompanying Angela Merkel as rapporteur on international trips and summits. In 2013, he was a face of the Die Welt brand campaign.

Robin Alexander is married, has three children and lives in Berlin.

Publications
Familie für Einsteiger. Ein Überlebenshandbuch. Rowohlt Berlin, Berlin 2007, .
Wenn Eltern laufen lernen. Eine Kurzanleitung. Rowohlt-Taschenbuch-Verlag, Reinbek 2009, .
Staatshilfe für Eltern Beltz Juventa, März 2013,

References

External links
 

1975 births
Living people
Writers from Essen
German male journalists
German journalists
German newspaper journalists
German male writers
21st-century German journalists
Die Welt people